Herbert "Herb" Eberhard Jordan Vollmer (February 15, 1895–November 8, 1961) was an American water polo player who competed in the 1920 Summer Olympics and in the 1924 Summer Olympics. He was born and died in New York City, and graduated from Stuyvesant High School in Manhattan.

In 1920 he was a member of the American team in the Olympic water polo tournament. He played three matches. Four years later he won the bronze medal with the American water polo team. He played all five matches and scored three goals.

In 1976, he was inducted into the USA Water Polo Hall of Fame.

See also
 List of Olympic medalists in water polo (men)
 List of members of the International Swimming Hall of Fame

References

External links
 

1895 births
1961 deaths
American male water polo players
Water polo players at the 1920 Summer Olympics
Water polo players at the 1924 Summer Olympics
Olympic bronze medalists for the United States in water polo
Stuyvesant High School alumni
Medalists at the 1924 Summer Olympics